Michael Rice (born 25 January 1996) is an Australian road cyclist, who last rode for UCI Continental team . He competed in the 2018 Tour of California.

Major results
2013
 1st  Road race, National Junior Road Championships
2016
 1st Stage 3b Tour de Beauce
2018
 1st Stage 4 Tour of the Gila

References

External links

1996 births
Living people
Australian male cyclists
Sportspeople from Canberra